

This is a list of properties and districts in Ohio that are listed on the National Register of Historic Places. There are over 4.000 in total. Of these, 73 are National Historic Landmarks. There are listings in each of Ohio's 88 counties.

The locations of National Register properties and districts (at least for all showing latitude and longitude coordinates below), may be seen in an online map by clicking on "Map of all coordinates".

Current listings by county
The following are approximate tallies of current listings by county. These counts are based on entries in the National Register Information Database as of April 24, 2008 and new weekly listings posted since then on the National Register of Historic Places web site. There are frequent additions to the listings and occasional delistings and the counts here are approximate and not official. New entries are added to the official Register on a weekly basis.  Also, the counts in this table exclude boundary increase and decrease listings which modify the area covered by an existing property or district and which carry a separate National Register reference number.

See also
List of National Historic Landmarks in Ohio
List of bridges on the National Register of Historic Places in Ohio

References

Ohio